Gustavo Fernández (born 20 January 1994) is an Argentine professional wheelchair tennis player. Fernández has been ranked as the world No. 1 in men's singles.

Fernández has won major singles titles at the 2016 French Open, the 2017 Australian Open, the 2019 Australian Open, the 2019 French Open, and the 2019 Wimbledon Championships. In doubles, he has won major titles at the 2015 Wimbledon Championships partnering Nicolas Peifer, and the 2019 French Open and 2022 Wimbledon Championships partnering Shingo Kunieda.

Career statistics

Grand Slam performance timelines

Wheelchair singles

Wheelchair doubles

References

External links
 
 

1994 births
Living people
Argentine male tennis players
Wheelchair tennis players
Paralympic wheelchair tennis players of Argentina
Wheelchair tennis players at the 2012 Summer Paralympics
Wheelchair tennis players at the 2016 Summer Paralympics
Sportspeople from Córdoba Province, Argentina
Wheelchair tennis players at the 2020 Summer Paralympics
ITF World Champions
21st-century Argentine people